Katachas is a village in Pieria regional unit, Greece. Since the 2011 local government reform it is part of the municipality Pydna-Kolindros, of which it is a municipal community. The village of Katachas had 524 residents as of 2011.

References

See also
 Pydna-Kolindros

Populated places in Pieria (regional unit)